Ta Loas is a khum (commune) of Moung Ruessei District in Battambang Province in north-western Cambodia.

Villages

 Ma Naok
 Suosdei
 Sdei Stueng
 Stueng Thmei
 Veal
 Voat Chas
 Chong Pralay
 Pralay Sdau
 Tras

References

Communes of Battambang province
Moung Ruessei District